A countermarked, punchmarked or counterstamped coin is a coin that has had some additional mark or symbol punched into it at some point after it was originally produced while in circulation. This practice is now obsolete.

Countermarking can be done for a variety of reasons. If the currency is reformed, existing coins may be rendered void. In this situation, coins already in circulation could be marked with the new value (according to the new currency system). The life span of existing coins could thus be extended, which might under some circumstances be a cheaper alternative to recalling the coins, melting them and striking replacements. Similarly, foreign coins could be marked as legal or accepted currency, thus allowing them to circulate in the area where they were countermarked. Countermarking can also be done for political reasons, i.e. a new state or régime demonstrating its authority by countermarking coins issued by the previous state.

Some experts recommend not to use the term countermark and counterstamp as synonyms, but in different contexts. A counterstamp is applied by a die, and by machine to an existing coin, while a countermark is punched onto the coin, mostly by hand, using a punch and a hammer or a primitive hand-operated machine. Often countermarks are applied by private persons, as is the case with chops (often referred to as chopmarks), which were punched by money changers, bankers or shroffs onto foreign coins circulating in China in the 19th century.  In contrast the use of counterstamps should be authorized by a local or national Government. An example of this would be post WWI in now modern day Germany to show hyperinflation.

The term punchmark, is mainly used when referring to the earliest Indian silver coins which are coin-like pieces of metal of a standard weight that are bearing various symbols which were applied with punches, resulting in what are known as punchmarked coins.

See also

 Overstrike (numismatics) — where a new design is struck over an existing coin
 Chop marks on coins
 Counterfeit
 Punch-marked coins
 Overprints, a printed equivalent to a countermark, found on banknotes or stamps

References
Bertsch, Wolfgang: "Chop or Chopmark?" Chopmark News. The Newsletter of the ChopMark Collectors Club, a special group of numismatists, vol. 8, no. 4, Chula Vista, October 2002, p. 12.
Cuhaj, George S. et al. Standard Catalog of World Coins 1901–2000, 42nd edition, Iola Wisconsin, 2014, p. 10, paragraph "Countermarks/Counterstamps".
Yap, Eldrich: "Counterstamp vs. Countermark". In: Chopmark News, Chopmark Collectors Club, Vol. 15, issue 4, Taipei, December 2011, pp. 115–116.

External links

The Museum of Countermarks on Roman Coins

Currency production
Inflation
Numismatic terminology